The 2016 Oceania Canoe Slalom Championships took place from 19 to 21 February 2016 in Penrith, Australia, under the auspices of International Canoe Federation (ICF), at the Penrith Whitewater Stadium facility, which was also the venue for the canoe/kayak slalom events at the 2000 Summer Olympics.

Schedule
The schedule of events.

Men

Canoe

Kayak

Women

Canoe

Kayak

External links
Official website

Oceania Canoe Slalom Championships
Oceania Canoe Slalom Championships
Canoeing in Australia